Dryops viennensis is a species of long-toed water beetle in the family Dryopidae. It is found in Europe and Northern Asia (excluding China) and North America.

References

Further reading

 
 

Dryopidae
Articles created by Qbugbot
Beetles described in 1841